Styrax vilcabambae (syn. Pamphilia vilcabambae D.R.Simpson) is a species of flowering plant found in the genus Styrax and the family Styracaceae. It is endemic to Peru.

References

vilcabambae
Endemic flora of Peru
Vulnerable plants
Taxonomy articles created by Polbot
Taxobox binomials not recognized by IUCN